The Dàjìng Gé Pavillon (上海古城墙和大境阁) is a museum and ancient temple of Shanghai, incorporating the last remaining portions of the walls of the Old City of Shanghai. Most of the walls were dismantled in 1912, and today only this portion remains.

In 1959 the Dajing Ge Pavillon was listed as a cultural relic and put under municipal protection. It was renovated in 1995, and then opened to the public.

The building houses a temple and a small museum with photographs of ancient Shanghai (上海老城厢史迹展).

Images

Museum exhibits

Address: Dajing Lu 239, Huangpu (黄浦区大境路239号)

Notes

Museums in Shanghai
History museums in China
City walls in China